Mittelland is one of districts of the Canton of Appenzell Ausserrhoden, Switzerland.

References 

Appenzell Ausserrhoden